Birdland 1951 is a live album by American jazz musician Miles Davis, released on January 27, 2004, by Blue Note Records and recorded from February 17, 1951, through September 29, 1951, in Birdland, from radio broadcasts. Three different broadcasts were chosen: two comprising six cuts in total were from June and September and have been issued in various forms on bootlegs over the decades. Four cuts were taken from a broadcast on February 17, which have never been available in any form.

Track listing 
"Move" (Denzil Best) – 6:13
"Half Nelson" (Davis) – 7:34
"Down" (Davis) – 7:14
"Out of the Blue" (Davis) – 5:54
"Half Nelson" (Davis) – 7:42
"Tempus Fugue-it" (Bud Powell) – 6:44
"Move" (Best) – 5:44
"Move" (Best) – 6:22
"The Squirrel" (Tadd Dameron) – 8:38
"Lady Bird" (Dameron) – 5:30

Personnel
Miles Davis – trumpet
June 2, tracks 1-3 
J.J. Johnson – trombone
Sonny Rollins – tenor saxophone
Kenny Drew – piano
Tommy Potter – double bass
Art Blakey – drums
February 17, tracks 4-7
J.J. Johnson – trombone
Sonny Rollins – tenor saxophone
Kenny Drew – piano
Tommy Potter – double bass
Art Blakey – drums
September 29, tracks 8-10
Eddie "Lockjaw" Davis – tenor saxophone
Big Nick Nicholas – tenor saxophone
Billy Taylor – piano
Charles Mingus – double bass
Art Blakey – drums

Production
Malcolm Addey – disc transfer
Michael Cuscuna – producer
Kurt Lundvall – mastering, restoration
Ken Robertson – digital restoration
Francis Wolff – photographer
Burton Yount – art director, cover design

References

External links

2004 live albums
Albums produced by Michael Cuscuna
Miles Davis live albums
Blue Note Records live albums